The Battle of Nekmíř was one of several raids carried out by the Bohemian Royalist forces, commanded by Bohuslav von Schwanberg, against Jan Žižka's Hussite troops.

The raid caught Hussite forces besieging the fortress of Nekmíř.

The Hussite force was able to break through Bohuslav's lines by using artillery (hand guns) mounted on wagons, and effect a retreat. This skirmish was the first documented use of the wagon fort during the Hussite wars.

The results of this conflict were important in demonstrating Jan Žižka's military competence in the minds of the Hussites. The Prague Hussites would later call for Žižka's assistance in defending their town against the crusading Imperial Army, despite having spurned him by acquiescing to the Royalists' demands after the initial Royalist-Hussite conflict in Prague.

External links 
 "The Hussite Wars (1419-36)", Stephen Turnbull, Osprey Publishing
 Osprey Hussite Wars book extract
 Hussite Battles and Significant events

Nekmer
1419 in Europe
Nekmir
Battles in Bohemia
Conflicts in 1419
Jan Žižka
History of the Plzeň Region